Peter Zemsky is an American-French academic. He is the deputy dean/dean of innovation and Eli Lilly chaired professor of strategy and innovation at INSEAD.

Early life
Zemsky is the oldest child of Robert Zemsky and Ann Zemsky. He grew up in Philadelphia, and attended Germantown Friends School. Zemsky graduated from the University of Pennsylvania, where he earned a bachelor of arts degree in economics in 1988, and he earned a PhD from the Stanford Graduate School of Business in 1995.

Career
Zemsky joined INSEAD as an assistant professor in 1994. He was a visiting professor at the Wharton School of the University of Pennsylvania in 2003. In 2011, he was appointed as the deputy dean for degree programmes and curriculum. In October 2013, he was appointed as the deputy dean of INSEAD and dean for strategic initiatives and innovation. He is now the dean of executive education and the Eli Lilly chaired professor of strategy and innovation at INSEAD. Zemsky has published academic articles in the American Economic Review, the RAND Journal of Economics, the Strategic Management Journal, and Management Science.

Personal life
Zemsky is a dual US-French citizen. He has four children.

References

Living people
University of Pennsylvania School of Arts and Sciences alumni
Stanford Graduate School of Business alumni
Academic staff of INSEAD
Business school deans
Year of birth missing (living people)
French university and college faculty deans
American university and college faculty deans